The Ivy League nude posture photos were taken in the 1940s through the 1970s of all incoming freshmen at Harvard, Yale, Princeton, UPenn (which are members of the Ivy League) and Seven Sisters colleges (as well as Swarthmore), ostensibly to gauge the rate and severity of rickets, scoliosis, and lordosis in the population. The photos are simple black-and-white images of each individual standing upright from front, back and side perspectives. Harvard previously had its own such program from the 1880s to the 1940s. The larger project was run by William Herbert Sheldon and Earnest Albert Hooton, who may have been using the data to support their theory on body types and social hierarchy. What remained of the images were transferred to the Smithsonian, and most were destroyed between 1995 and 2001. However, starting in 2020, hundreds of photos of male freshman from Yale have gone up for sale individually on eBay, ensuring that many remain in private collections.

Schools involved

Brooklyn College
Harvard University
Hotchkiss School
Mount Holyoke College
Purdue University
Princeton University
Radcliffe College
Smith College
Swarthmore College
Syracuse University
University of California
University of Pennsylvania
University of Wisconsin
Vassar College
Wellesley College
Yale University

See also

Somatotype and constitutional psychology

References

External links
Dick Cavett on his experience

Nude photography
Human appearance
Nude posture photographs
Collection of the Smithsonian Institution
Nudity in the United States
20th-century controversies in the United States